County Hall is a municipal facility on The Mall in Castlebar, County Mayo, Ireland.

History
The site currently occupied by County Hall was home to the county infirmary until 1932. Mayo County Council, which had previously  held its meetings in Castlebar Courthouse, acquired the site and used it as a machinery yard and fire station before converting it for use as the new county council offices in 1989.

References

Buildings and structures in County Mayo
Castlebar